Didea intermedia is a European species of hoverfly.

References

Diptera of Europe
Syrphinae
Insects described in 1854
Taxa named by Hermann Loew